Robert Emhardt (July 24, 1914 – December 26, 1994) was an American character actor who worked on stage, in film, and on television. Emhardt was frequently  cast as a villain, often a crooked businessman or corrupt politician.

Early years 
Emhardt was born in Indianapolis, Indiana.

Career
Emhardt studied acting at the Royal Academy of Dramatic Art in London. He began his Broadway career in the 1930s as an understudy for the equally heavyset Sydney Greenstreet. Emhardt made his stage debut in The Pirate (1942). One of the founding members of the Actors Studio, Emhardt was a member of the cast of the original 1952 Broadway stage production of The Seven Year Itch. He won the Critics Circle Award for best supporting actor for his performance in Life with Mother in the 1948–1949 season.

His notable film appearances include 3:10 to Yuma (1957) and Underworld U.S.A. (1961).

On television, he was the first actor to play Mac Cory on Another World. He also made over 250 guest appearances on such series as Alfred Hitchcock Presents, Riverboat, The Tall Man, The Twilight Zone, GE True, Stoney Burke, Going My Way, The Untouchables, Perry Mason (3 episodes), The Naked City, The Tom Ewell Show, My Three Sons, The Wild Wild West, The Andy Griffith Show (2 episodes), Gunsmoke, The Man From U.N.C.L.E., The Invaders,  Adam-12, The Brady Bunch,  Cannon, Kojak, The Mary Tyler Moore Show, Bonanza, Have Gun, Will Travel and Quincy, M.E..

Personal life and death

Emhardt married actress Martha Jones (later married name Martha Rofheart) in 1943, with whom he had appeared on Broadway in both Harriet and The Pirate. After the dissolution of the marriage, he married actress Silvia Sideli in 1954. They had a son named Christopher and a daughter named Mia.

Emhardt died of heart problems at his home in Ojai, California, on December 26, 1994, at the age of 80.

Filmography

Marco Millions (1939 TV movie)
The Dagmar Story (1951 TV movie) – Pa Lewis
The Iron Mistress (1952) – Gen. Cuny
The Big Knife (1955) (uncredited)
3:10 to Yuma (1957) – Mr. Butterfield, Stage Line Owner
The Badlanders (1958) – Sample
Wake Me When It's Over (1960) – Joab Martinson
Underworld U.S.A. (1961) – Earl Connors
The Intruder (1962) – Verne Shipman
Kid Galahad (1962) – Maynard
The Magnificent Yankee (1965 TV movie) – Henry Adams
Diamond Jim: Skulduggery in Samantha (1965 TV movie) – Schindler
The Group (1966) – Mr. Andrews
Hostile Guns (1967) – R. C. Crawford
Where Were You When the Lights Went Out? (1968) – Otis J. Hendershot Sr
Rascal (1969) – Constable
Change of Habit (1969) – The Banker
Suppose They Gave a War and Nobody Came (1970) – Lester Calhoun
The Boy Who Stole the Elephant (1970 TV movie) – Cy Brown
Lawman (1971) – Hersham
Lock, Stock and Barrel (1971 TV movie) – Sam Hartwig
Scorpio (1973) – Man in hotel
The Stone Killer (1973) – Fussy Man
Night Games (1974 TV movie) – Judge Ambrose
Rex Harrison Presents Stories of Love (1974 TV movie)
It's Alive (1974) – The Executive
The F.B.I. Story: The FBI Versus Alvin Karpis, Public Enemy Number One (1974 TV movie) – Dr. Willards
Demon, Demon (1975 TV movie)
Alex & the Gypsy (1976) – Judge Ehrlinger
The Chopped Liver Brothers (1977 TV movie) – Duffy
Fraternity Row (1977) – Brother Bob Abernathy
It Happened One Christmas (1977 TV movie) – Judge
The Seniors (1978) – The Bishop
Die Sister, Die! (1978) – James Lendon Price
Pleasure Cove (1979 TV movie) – Fat Man at Bar
Institute for Revenge (1979 TV movie) – Senator
Aunt Mary (1979 TV movie) – Berwick
Forced Vengeance (1982) – Carl Gerlich

Partial television credits
Alfred Hitchcock Presents (episode "Crackpot") (1957) – Mr. Moon
Kraft Television Theatre (two-part teleplay "All the King's Men") (1958)
Alcoa Presents: One Step Beyond (episode "Make Me Not a Witch") (1959) – Priest
Perry Mason (episode "Case of the Ominous Outcast") (1960) – J.J. Flaherty
The Twilight Zone (episode "Static") (1961) – Professor Ackerman 
 The Barbara Stanwyck Show (episode "The Golden Acres") (1961) – Ben

References

External links

1914 births
1994 deaths
20th-century American male actors
Alumni of RADA
American male film actors
American male stage actors
American male television actors
Male actors from Indianapolis
Male actors from Los Angeles
People from Ojai, California